The northwestern coastal ctenotus, little leopard ctenotus, or Airlie Island ctenuous (Ctenotus angusticeps)  is a species of skink found in Western Australia.

References

angusticeps
Reptiles described in 1988
Taxa named by Glen Milton Storr